USS LST-457 was a United States Navy  used in the Asiatic-Pacific Theater during World War II.

Construction
LST-457 was laid down on 3 August 1942, under Maritime Commission (MARCOM) contract, MC hull 977, by  Kaiser Shipyards, Vancouver, Washington; launched on 23 October 1942; and commissioned on 6 February 1943,.

Service history
During the war, LST-457 was assigned to the Pacific Theater of Operations. She took part in the Eastern New Guinea operations, the Lae occupation in September 1943, and the Saidor occupation in January and February 1944; the Bismarck Archipelago operations, the Cape Gloucester, New Britain, landings from December 1943 through February 1944, and the Admiralty Islands landings in March 1944; the Hollandia operation in April 1944; the Western New Guinea operations, the Toem-Wakde-Sarmi area operation in May 1944, the Biak Islands operation in May and June 1944, the Noemfoor Island operation in July 1944, and the Morotai landing in September 1944; the Visayan Island landings March and April 1945; and the Balikpapan operation in June and July 1945.

Post-war service
Following the war, LST-457 performed occupation duty in the Far East until mid-October 1945. She returned to the United States and was decommissioned on 15 March 1946. The ship was struck from the Navy list on 29 September 1947. On 20 April 1948, she was sold to the Bethlehem Steel Co., of Bethlehem, Pennsylvania, and subsequently scrapped.

Honors and awards
LST-457 earned seven battle stars for her World War II service.

Notes 

Citations

Bibliography 

Online resources

External links

 

LST-1-class tank landing ships
World War II amphibious warfare vessels of the United States
1942 ships
S3-M2-K2 ships
Ships built in Vancouver, Washington